Peter Nathaniel Stearns (born March 3, 1936) is a professor at George Mason University, where he was provost from January 1, 2000 to July 2014.

Stearns was chair of the Department of History at Carnegie Mellon University and also served as the Dean of the College of Humanities and Social Sciences (now named Dietrich College of Humanities and Social Sciences) at Carnegie Mellon University. In addition, he founded and edited the Journal of Social History.  While at Carnegie Mellon, he developed a pioneering approach to teaching World History, and has contributed to the field as well through editing, and contributing to, the Routledge series, Themes in World History. He is also known for various work on the nature and impact of the industrial revolution and for exploration of new topics, particularly in the history of emotions.

He is active in historical groups such as the American Historical Association, the Society for French Historical Studies, the Social Science History Association and the International Society for Research on Emotion.

Early life
Peter Stearns was born in London, but of American parents (Raymond and Elizabeth) and was an American citizen at birth. He was raised in Urbana, Illinois and attended public grade school and then the University of Illinois High School. After graduating from Harvard College, summa cum laude, he had a traveling fellowship in Europe and then returned to complete his PhD at Harvard. He has four children and a stepson, and five grandchildren. He has held positions at the University of Chicago, Rutgers, Carnegie Mellon, and now George Mason.

Education and career
He attended Harvard College and later received his Ph.D. from Harvard University. In his prolific career as an author and editor, he has written or edited over 135 different books.  Stearns served as founding chair of the Advanced Placement World History committee and as Vice President for Teaching of the American Historical Association.

Works 
His books include:
 1848: The Revolutionary Tide in Europe, Norton, 1974
 American Behavioral History
 
 

 Battleground of Desire
 
 
 Cultural Change in Modern World History
 Cultures in Motion
 Debating the Industrial Revolution (2015)
 Documents in World History
 Emotion and Social Change
 Encyclopedia of European Social History
 The Encyclopedia of World History
 

 Global Outrage
 
 
 Guiding the American University: Challenges and Choices (2015)
 History of Shame (2017)
 Time in World History (2019)
 
 
 Knowing, Teaching, and Learning History: National and International Perspectives
 Lives of Labour: Work in a Maturing Industrial Society (1975)

 
 
 
 The Industrial Turn in World History (2016)
 The Revolutions of 1848 (1974)
 Tolerance in World History 

 World Civilizations
 World History in Brief
 World History: Patterns of Change and Continuity

See also

List of Carnegie Mellon University people
List of Harvard University people
List of historians
List of people from Virginia

Notes

References
 Chair, AP World History Development Committee

Place of birth missing (living people)
21st-century American historians
21st-century American male writers
Carnegie Mellon University faculty
George Mason University faculty
Harvard College alumni
Historians of Africa
Historians of Europe
Living people
Social historians
1936 births
Canadian Knights Bachelor
American male non-fiction writers